The 2007 Quebec general election was held in the Canadian province of Quebec on March 26, 2007 to elect members of the 38th National Assembly of Quebec. The Quebec Liberal Party led by Premier Jean Charest managed to win a plurality of seats, but were reduced to a minority government, Quebec's first in 129 years, since the 1878 general election. The Action démocratique du Québec, in a major breakthrough, became the official opposition. The Parti Québécois was relegated to third-party status for the first time since the 1973 election. The Liberals won their lowest share of the popular vote since Confederation, and the PQ with their 28.35% of the votes cast won their lowest share since 1973 and their second lowest ever (ahead of only the 23.06% attained in their initial election campaign in 1970). Each of the three major parties won nearly one-third of the popular vote, the closest three-way split (in terms of popular vote) in Quebec electoral history until the 2012 election. This was however, the closest three-way race in terms of seat count. Voter turnout among those eligible was 71.23%, a marginal difference from the previous general election in 2003.

This was the first time since the 1970s that a government was not returned for its second term with a majority.

Overview
With just over a year left in the government's five year mandate, the Liberals called an election for March 26, 2007.

In August 2006, there were widespread rumours of an election to be held in the fall with speculation that Premier Jean Charest wanted to hold elections before a federal election would be held.

Benoît Pelletier, the minister responsible for electoral reform, had announced his plan to table two bills about election reform during the fall, possibly leading to a referendum on voting system reform to be held concurrently with the election. However, by December 2006, the plan was put off indefinitely due to strong resistance to the idea of proportional representation from within the Liberal Party.

Speculation grew that a provincial election would be held following the federal budget. It was thought that the federal Conservative government would present a budget that would address the perceived fiscal imbalance. This measure would help Charest argue that his government was more effective in getting concessions from the federal government than a PQ government would be. With polls showing Charest's Liberals ahead of the opposition for the first time in several years, speculation intensified that Charest would not wait until the federal budget to call a provincial election but call one in the winter to take advantage of both of these developments. Charest recalled the legislature early in order to table a provincial budget on February 20, 2007. On the same day, federal Minister of Finance Jim Flaherty announced that the federal budget would be tabled on March 19, clearing the way for Charest to set a provincial election for a week later in hopes of benefiting from Flaherty's budget. On February 21, Charest called the election for March 26.

Issues
Charest wants to negotiate a solution to the problem of the fiscal imbalance between the federal and provincial governments with Prime Minister Stephen Harper.

André Boisclair, leader of the Parti Québécois, had said he would hold a referendum (or "popular consultation", as in the party platform) on the issue of Quebec independence as soon as possible after an election win.

Multiculturalism, secularism and the place of cultural and religious minorities in Quebec were issues in this election. There was a large scale debate over "reasonable accommodation" towards cultural minorities, and a few political leaders expressed their views on the question. Mario Dumont, leader of the Action démocratique, took a clearer position on the question than the others, calling on the majority to protect some elements of national identity and values such as gender equality, and suggesting that a Quebec Constitution be written, in which the privileges cultural minorities are to be given would be clarified.

Timeline
2005
November 15 - André Boisclair is elected as leader of the Parti Québécois with 53.7% of the vote from party members.
December 12 - Two by-elections are held. The election of Raymond Bachand allows the Liberals to keep the riding of Outremont, while former Bloc Québécois MP Stéphane Bergeron wins Verchères, Bernard Landry's former riding, for the Parti Québécois.
2006
February 4 - Québec solidaire, a new left-wing party, is formed from the merger of the Union des forces progressistes party and the Option citoyenne political movement.
February 28 - Raymond Bachand enters cabinet as Minister of Economic Development, Innovation and Export Trade. In this same cabinet shuffle, Thomas Mulcair loses the job of Environment minister to Claude Béchard. Some pundits speculate that Mulcair was punished for his opposition to the Mont Orford condo development project.
April 10 - The Parti Québécois keeps the riding of Sainte-Marie–Saint-Jacques in a by-election. Martin Lemay is elected with 41.2% of the vote. Notably, Manon Massé, the candidate from Québec solidaire, finishes third with 22.2% of the vote in this working-class district, while the Action démocratique only gets 1.9% of the vote, down from 8.3% in the 2003 general election.
August 14 - By-elections are held in Pointe-aux-Trembles and Taillon. André Boisclair is unsurprisingly and easily elected in Pointe-aux-Trembles, the Liberals and Action démocratique having declined to field candidates against him. The Greens place second with 12% and Québec solidaire, third with 8%. Marie Malavoy of the Parti Québécois is elected in Taillon.
August 22 - Boisclair and Malavoy are sworn in as members of the National Assembly. Boisclair becomes opposition leader.
October 17 - The fall session of the National Assembly starts, with the current crisis in Quebec's forestry industry as the most important issue.
November 27 - In a vote of 266 to 16, The House of Commons of Canada voted to recognise Québécois as a nation within a unified Canada, once again putting the issue of independence in the spotlight.
2007
January 19 - Radio-Canada reveals that Pierre Descoteaux, Liberal member from Groulx, almost crossed the floor to the Parti Québécois during the fall 2006.
January 22 - During a visit to France, André Boisclair meets Ségolène Royal, Socialist candidate for the 2007 presidential election. At this occasion, Royal expresses her support for the "liberty and sovereignty" of Quebec. After being criticized by several French media and French and Canadian politicians, such as prime minister Stephen Harper and opposition leader Stéphane Dion, Royal clarifies her thought by saying that she was not interfering in Canadian internal affairs or trying to dictate Quebec's policy, but that the future of Quebec will have to be decided by Quebecers.
February 14 - Pierre Arcand, former president of Corus and presumed Liberal candidate in Mont-Royal, expresses his displeasure with Action démocratique leader Mario Dumont by comparing him with Jean-Marie Le Pen. In response, Dumont threatens legal action but Arcand refuses to apologize. Premier Jean Charest stands by his candidate, and is called a "little partisan premier" by Dumont.
February 20 - Finance minister Michel Audet tables a budget. Among other measures, this budget promises income tax reductions of 250 million dollars and allocates new sums of money to the health and education systems, as well as to the maintenance of roads and bridges. Spending is also increased for the protection of the environment and for the regions' economic development.
February 21 - Premier Jean Charest calls a general election for March 26.
March 1 - Radio DJ Louis Champagne of Saguenay creates a controversy by attacking André Boisclair and the Parti Québécois candidate in Saguenay, Sylvain Gaudreault, over their homosexuality, saying that the factory workers of Jonquière would never vote for gays. He also says the Parti Québécois is like a "club of fags". (Gaudreault went on to win the riding.) Boisclair responds that Champagne's remarks are insulting towards the people of Saguenay. Premier Charest and Action démocratique leader Dumont also condemn the attacks. Champagne is later suspended from his job and has to apologize.
March 4 - Jean-François Plante, the Action démocratique candidate in Deux-Montagnes, makes controversial comments about women on his blog. Among other things, he questions the provincial government's policies of affirmative action for women and of wage equity between traditionally masculine and feminine occupations, claiming that they lead to discrimination against men. He retracts his comments on the next day, but also accuses André Boisclair of "playing" his homosexuality when it helps him. As a result, he is forced to withdraw his candidacy on March 8. He is replaced as ADQ candidate in Deux-Montagnes by Lucie Leblanc.
March 6 - Premier Jean Charest brings the issue of Quebec independence at the forefront of the campaign by saying, while speaking with an English-language journalist, that he does not believe that in the case of separation, Quebec would necessarily keep its territorial integrity. Charest later claims that what he had actually wanted to say was that Quebec was indivisible, but his opponents recall comments he had made in 1996, while he was the leader of the federal Progressive Conservatives, to the effect that in the case of a "yes" result in the 1995 referendum, the Cree and Inuit would have had a good legal basis on which to declare independence from Quebec.
March 8 - Newspaper La Presse publishes an article claiming that in a 2003 book, Robin Philpot, Parti Québécois candidate in Saint-Henri–Sainte-Anne, had denied that a genocide had taken place in Rwanda in 1994. Philpot later says that he had not denied that massacres had taken place, but that he wanted people to remember that they had been committed by all parties to the conflict. André Boisclair says that he is "hurt" by his candidate's comments and reminds that the existence of the Rwandan genocide is not in question.
March 13 - The leaders debate took place in Quebec City. The Liberals, the Parti Québécois and the Action démocratique du Québec took part but Québec solidaire and the Green party were not invited to participate.
March 19 - The federal government releases a budget which gives Quebec 2.3 billion dollars.
March 23 - There is widespread outcry when poll clerks are instructed on how to let women wearing the niqāb, an Islamic face veil, vote. After the longstanding policy was criticized by all three main parties, the chief electoral officer reversed his decision and stated that all voters would have to show their face, but not before being inundated by complaints from people opposed to this form of reasonable accommodation for the immigrant population. Meanwhile, women who actually wear the niqāb say they were never opposed to showing their face when voting.
March 26 - Election date.

Political parties

Major parties 
 Action démocratique du Québec
 Quebec Liberal Party
 Parti Québécois
 Green Party of Quebec
 Québec solidaire

Other parties 
Additionally, several other parties were registered as well: Parti conscience universelle, Marxist–Leninist Party of Quebec, Equality Party, Bloc pot, and Union des forces progressistes.

Results
The overall results were:

|- style="background-color:#CCCCCC"
!rowspan="2" colspan="2" style="text-align:left;" |Party
!rowspan="2" style="text-align:left;" |Party leader
!rowspan="2"|Candi-dates
!colspan="5" style="text-align:center;" |Seats
!colspan="3" style="text-align:center;" |Popular vote
|- style="background-color:#CCCCCC"
| style="text-align:center;" |2003
| style="text-align:center;" |Dissol.
| style="text-align:center;" |2007
| style="text-align:center;" |Change
| style="text-align:center;" |%
| style="text-align:center;" |#
| style="text-align:center;" |%
| style="text-align:center;" |Change

| style="text-align:left;" |Jean Charest
| style="text-align:right;" |125
| style="text-align:right;" |76
| style="text-align:right;" |72
| style="text-align:right;" |48
| style="text-align:right;" |-28
| style="text-align:right;" |38.40%
| style="text-align:right;" |1,313,664
| style="text-align:right;" |33.08%
| style="text-align:right;" |-12.91%

| style="text-align:left;" |Mario Dumont
| style="text-align:right;" |125
| style="text-align:right;" |4
| style="text-align:right;" |5
| style="text-align:right;" |41
| style="text-align:right;" |+37
| style="text-align:right;" |32.80%
| style="text-align:right;" |1,224,412
| style="text-align:right;" |30.84%
| style="text-align:right;" |+12.63%

| style="text-align:left;" |André Boisclair
| style="text-align:right;" |125
| style="text-align:right;" |45
| style="text-align:right;" |45
| style="text-align:right;" |36
| style="text-align:right;" |-9
| style="text-align:right;" |28.80%
| style="text-align:right;" |1,125,546
| style="text-align:right;" |28.35%
| style="text-align:right;" |-4.91%

| style="text-align:left;" |Scott McKay
| style="text-align:right;" |108
| style="text-align:right;" |-
| style="text-align:right;" |-
| style="text-align:right;" |-
| style="text-align:right;" |-
| style="text-align:right;" |-
| style="text-align:right;" |152,885
| style="text-align:right;" |3.85%
| style="text-align:right;" |+3.41%

| style="text-align:left;" |Régent Séguin†
| style="text-align:right;" |123
| style="text-align:right;" |-
| style="text-align:right;" |-
| style="text-align:right;" |-
| style="text-align:right;" |-
| style="text-align:right;" |-
| style="text-align:right;" |144,418
| style="text-align:right;" |3.64%
| style="text-align:right;" |+2.58%‡

| style="text-align:left;" |Pierre Chénier
| style="text-align:right;" |24
| style="text-align:right;" |-
| style="text-align:right;" |-
| style="text-align:right;" |-
| style="text-align:right;" |-
| style="text-align:right;" |-
| style="text-align:right;" |2,091
| style="text-align:right;" |0.05%
| style="text-align:right;" |-0.02%

| style="text-align:left;" |Hugô St-Onge
| style="text-align:right;" |9
| style="text-align:right;" |-
| style="text-align:right;" |-
| style="text-align:right;" |-
| style="text-align:right;" |-
| style="text-align:right;" |-
| style="text-align:right;" |1,564
| style="text-align:right;" |0.04%
| style="text-align:right;" |-0.56%

| style="text-align:left;" |Gilles Noël
| style="text-align:right;" |12
| style="text-align:right;" |-
| style="text-align:right;" |-
| style="text-align:right;" |-
| style="text-align:right;" |-
| style="text-align:right;" |-
| style="text-align:right;" |1,548
| style="text-align:right;" |0.04%
| style="text-align:right;" |-0.05%

| colspan=2 style="text-align:left;" |Independents and no affiliation
| style="text-align:right;" |28
| style="text-align:right;" |-
| style="text-align:right;" |1
| style="text-align:right;" |-
| style="text-align:right;" |-
| style="text-align:right;" |-
| style="text-align:right;" |4,490
| style="text-align:right;" |0.11%
| style="text-align:right;" |-0.11%

| style="text-align:left;" colspan="4"|Vacant
| style="text-align:right;" |2
| style="text-align:center;" colspan="5" | 
|-
| style="text-align:left;" colspan="3"|Total
| style="text-align:right;" |679
| style="text-align:right;" |125
| style="text-align:right;" |125
| style="text-align:right;" |125
| style="text-align:right;" |-
| style="text-align:right;" |100%
| style="text-align:right;" |3,970,618 
| style="text-align:right;" |100%
| style="text-align:right;" | 
|-
| style="text-align:left;" colspan="13"|Source: (official)
Notes:
"Change" refers to change from previous election
† Séguin is officially leader of Québec solidaire, but the main spokespersons for the party are Françoise David and Amir Khadir.
‡ Results for Québec solidaire are compared to the 2003 results for the Union des forces progressistes.
|-
|}

Results by region

Results by place

Opinion polls

 *Swammer performs "live" trend analysis, meaning the results are updated daily.

Campaign slogans
Action démocratique du Québec: Au Québec, on passe à l'action - In Quebec, We're Taking Action
Parti libéral du Québec: Unis pour réussir - Moving Forward Together
Parti Québécois: Reconstruisons notre Québec - Rebuild Our Quebec
Parti vert du Québec: Je vote - I vote
Québec solidaire: Soyons lucides, votons solidaire - Let's Be Clear-Eyed, Let's Vote for Solidarity

Incumbent MNAs not running for re-election

Independent
Daniel Bouchard, Mégantic-Compton

List of candidates
The results in each riding (electoral division) were:

Cabinet members and party leaders are in bold type.

Bas-Saint-Laurent and Gaspésie–Îles-de-la-Madeleine

|-
| style="background:whitesmoke;"|Bonaventure
||
|Nathalie Normandeau 10,221
|
|Doris Chapados 5,710
|
|Karine Delarosbil 2,357
|
|Hélène Morin 1,039
|
|
|
|
||
|Nathalie Normandeau
|-
| style="background:whitesmoke;"|Gaspé
|
|Georges Mamelonet 7,022
||
|Guy Lelièvre 7,662
|
|Bruno Cloutier 3,162
|
|Annie Chouinard 858
|
|
|
|
||
|Guy Lelièvre
|-
| style="background:whitesmoke;"|Îles-de-la-Madeleine
|
|Pierre Proulx 2,642
||
|Maxime Arseneau 4,820
|
|Patrick Leblanc 380
|
|
|
|Nicolas Tremblay 139
|
|
||
|Maxime Arseneau
|-
| style="background:whitesmoke;"|Kamouraska-Témiscouata
||
|Claude Béchard 9,826
|
|Nancy Gagnon 4,804
|
|Gérald Beaulieu 9,074
|
|Céline Tremblay 521
|
|Lise Lebel 515
|
|
||
|Claude Béchard
|-
| style="background:whitesmoke;"|Matane
|
|Nancy Charest 7,617
||
|Pascal Bérubé 7,830
|
|Donald Grenier 3,980
|
|Brigitte Michaud 358
|
|François Vincent 240
|
|
||
|Nancy Charest
|-
| style="background:whitesmoke;"|Matapédia
|
|Normand Boulianne 5,137
||
|Danielle Doyer 9,041
|
|Rémy Villeneuve 5,436
|
|Dominic Fortin 551
|
|Jean-François Guay 526
|
|
||
|Danielle Doyer
|-
| style="background:whitesmoke;"|Rimouski
|
|Hélène Ménard 6,988
||
|Irvin Pelletier 12,925
|
|Roger Picard 9,394
|
|Guylaine Bélanger 1,894
|
|Stéphanie Théorêt 651
|
|
||
|Solange Charest †
|-
| style="background:whitesmoke;"|Rivière-du-Loup
|
|Jean D'Amour 7,390
|
|Hugues Belzile 2,821
||
|Mario Dumont 15,276
|
|
|
|Martin Poirier 639
|
|
||
|Mario Dumont
|}

Saguenay–Lac-Saint-Jean and Côte-Nord 

|-
| style="background:whitesmoke;"|Chicoutimi
|
|André Harvey 12,919
||
|Stéphane Bédard 13,965
|
|Luc Picard 6,155
|
|Colette Fournier 1,093
|
|Daniel Fortin 803
|
|
||
|Stéphane Bédard
|-
| style="background:whitesmoke;"|Dubuc
|
|Johnny Simard 7,077
||
|Jacques Côté 10,120
|
|Robert Émond 8,401
|
|Marie Francine Bienvenue 728
|
|Michel Marécat 602
|
|
||
|Jacques Côté
|-
| style="background:whitesmoke;"|Duplessis
|
|Marc Proulx 6,332
||
|Lorraine Richard 10,205
|
|Bernard Lefrançois 4,959
|
|Olivier Noël 689
|
|Jacques Gélineau 621
|
|
||
|Lorraine Richard
|-
| style="background:whitesmoke;"|Jonquière
|
|Françoise Gauthier 11,576
||
|Sylvain Gaudreault 12,851
|
|Marc Jomphe 6,634
|
|Sylvain Bergeron 839
|
|Dominic Rouette 703
|
|Pierre Laliberté (No designation) 71
||
|Françoise Gauthier
|-
| style="background:whitesmoke;"|Lac-Saint-Jean
|
|Yves Bolduc 9,175
||
|Alexandre Cloutier 14,750
|
|Éric Girard 6,837
|
|Denis Plamondon 536
|
|Vital Tremblay 474
|
|
||
|Stéphan Tremblay †
|-
| style="background:whitesmoke;"|René-Lévesque
|
|François Désy 3,723
||
|Marjolain Dufour 12,160
|
|André Desrosiers 6,642
|
|Mylène Lapierre 426
|
|Styves Griffith 533
|
|
||
|Marjolain Dufour
|-
| style="background:whitesmoke;"|Roberval
|
|Karl Blackburn 11,141
||
|Denis Trottier 13,506
|
|Mario-Michel Jomphe 6,638
|
|Nicole Schmitt 1,065
|
|
|
|
||
|Karl Blackburn
|}

Capitale-Nationale

|-
| style="background:whitesmoke;"|Charlesbourg
|
|Éric R. Mercier 10,843
|
|Richard Marceau 9,828
||
|Catherine Morissette 17,207
|
|Réjean Dumais 837
|
|Rama Borne MacDonald 968
|
|
||
|Éric R. Mercier
|-
| style="background:whitesmoke;"|Charlevoix
|
|Jean-Guy Bouchard 6,541
||
|Rosaire Bertrand 9,099
|
|Conrad Harvey 7,436
|
|Lucie Charbonneau 527
|
|David Turcotte 553
|
|
||
|Rosaire Bertrand
|-
| style="background:whitesmoke;"|Chauveau
|
|Sarah Perreault 8,849
|
|Robert Miller 6,680
||
|Gilles Taillon 22,013
|
|Nathalie Brochu 800
|
|Mathilde Lavoie Morency 1,255
|
|
||
|Sarah Perreault
|-
| style="background:whitesmoke;"|Jean-Lesage
|
|Michel Després 10,185
|
|Christian Simard 7,990
||
|Jean-François Gosselin 13,865
|
|Jean-Yves Desgagnés 1,236
|
|Lucien Rodrigue 1,159
|
|Jean Bédard (M-L) 100José Breton (Ind) 131 Danielle Benny (DCQ) 116
||
|Michel Després
|-
| style="background:whitesmoke;"|Jean-Talon
||
|Philippe Couillard 13,732
|
|Véronique Hivon 9,859
|
|Luc de la Sablonnière 6,056
|
|Monique Voisine 1,463
|
|Ali Dahan 1,518
|
|Francis Denis (DCQ) 95
||
|Margaret F. Delisle
|-
| style="background:whitesmoke;"|La Peltrie
|
|France Hamel 11,171
|
|Robert Beauregard 7,033
||
|Éric Caire 21,055
|
|Guillame Boivin 772
|
|Priscilla Schafer 1,203
|
|
||
|France Hamel
|-
| style="background:whitesmoke;"|Louis-Hébert
||
|Sam Hamad 14,410
|
|André Joli-Coeur 10,429
|
|Jean Nobert 13,594
|
|Catherine Lebossé 1,326
|
|André Larocque 1,734
|
|Claude Cloutier (DCQ) 225
||
|Sam Hamad
|-
| style="background:whitesmoke;"|Montmorency
|
|Raymond Bernier 9,124
|
|Daniel Leblond 8,171
||
|Hubert Benoit 20,796
|
|Jacques Legros 772
|
|Julien Rodrigue 1,172
|
|Denise Jetté-Cloutier (DCQ) 149 François Martin (Ind) 356
||
|Raymond Bernier
|-
| style="background:whitesmoke;"|Portneuf
|
|Jean-Pierre Soucy 10,861
|
|Martin Courval 5,667
||
|Raymond Francoeur 15,496
|
|André Lavoie 580
|
|Simon Sauvageau 1,145
|
|
||
|Jean-Pierre Soucy
|-
| style="background:whitesmoke;"|Taschereau
|
|Philippe Cannon 7,073
||
|Agnès Maltais 12,340
|
|Caroline Pageau 9,162
|
|Serge Roy 2,741
|
|Yonnel Bonaventure 1,860
|
|Luc Schulz (Ind) 81
||
|Agnès Maltais
|-
| style="background:whitesmoke;"|Vanier
|
|Jean-Claude L'Abbée 9,733
|
|Sylvain Lévesque 7,694
||
|Sylvain Légaré 20,699
|
|Marie Dionne 859
|
|Lucien Gravelle 1,149
|
|Louis Casgrain (DCQ) 103
||
|Sylvain Légaré
|}

Mauricie

|-
| style="background:whitesmoke;"|Champlain
|
|Christian Fortin 7,635
|
|Noëlla Champagne 10,871
||
|Pierre-Michel Auger 15,872
|
|Alex Noël 1,039
|
|
|
|
||
|Noëlla Champagne
|-
| style="background:whitesmoke;"|Laviolette
||
|Julie Boulet 10,100
|
|Patrick Lahaie 6,687
|
|Stéphane Defoy 6,826
|
|Pierrette Doucet 468
|
|Pierre Audette 494
|
|Josée Lafontaine (DCQ) 66
||
|Julie Boulet
|-
| style="background:whitesmoke;"|Maskinongé
|
|Francine Gaudet 10,767
|
|Rémy Désilets 10,008
||
|Jean Damphousse 14,862
|
|Mario Landry 699
|
|Frédéric Demouy 781
|
|
||
|Francine Gaudet
|-
| style="background:whitesmoke;"|Saint-Maurice
|
|France Beaulieu 6,487
|
|Claude Pinard 8,494
||
|Robert Deschamps 9,788
|
|Marianne Mathis 796
|
|
|
|Francis Mondou (Ind) 387
||
|Claude Pinard
|-
| style="background:whitesmoke;"|Trois-Rivières
|
|André Gabias 7,862
|
|Jean-Pierre Adam 7,672
||
|Sébastien Proulx 10,247
|
|André Lemay 907
|
|Louis Lacroix 739
|
|Stéphan Vincent (Ind) 121
||
|André Gabias
|}

Chaudière-Appalaches and Centre-du-Québec

|-
| style="background:whitesmoke;"|Arthabaska
|
|Claude Bachand 11,145
|
|Thérèse Domingue 7920
||
|Jean-François Roux 15,323
|
|Bill Ninacs 1,135
|
|François Fillion 1,038
|
|
||
|Claude Bachand
|-
| style="background:whitesmoke;"|Beauce-Nord
|
|Claude Drouin 8,056
|
|Denis Couture 2,392
||
|Janvier Grondin 19,127
|
|Christian Dubois 361
|
|Jérémie Vachon 525
|
|Benoît Roy (Ind) 83
||
|Janvier Grondin
|-
| style="background:whitesmoke;"|Beauce-Sud
|
|Diane Leblanc 10,301
|
|André Côté 3,582
||
|Claude Morin 19,371
|
|Marie-Claude Bisson 835
|
|
|
|
||
|Diane Leblanc
|-
| style="background:whitesmoke;"|Bellechasse
|
|Dominique Vien 9,005
|
|Sylvie Vallières 3,511
||
|Jean Domingue 12,714
|
|Colin Perreault 460
|
|Ghislain Gaulin 512
|
|
||
|Dominique Vien
|-
| style="background:whitesmoke;"|Chutes-de-la-Chaudière
|
|France Proulx 7,292
|
|Yvan Loubier 7,618
||
|Marc Picard 24,378
|
|Éveline Gueppe 854
|
|Jean-Luc Bugnon 1,183
|
|
||
|Marc Picard
|-
| style="background:whitesmoke;"|Drummond
|
|Lyne Boisvert 9,476
|
|Normand Jutras 12,960
||
|Sébastien Schneeberger 15,343
|
|Luce Daneau 1,645
|
|
|
|Mario G. Bergeron (Ind) 380
||
|Normand Jutras
|-
| style="background:whitesmoke;"|Frontenac
||
|Laurent Lessard 10,440
|
|Juliette Jalbert 5,264
|
|Alain Gariépy 8,831
|
|Dominique Bernier 391
|
|Pierre Richard 496
|
|
||
|Laurent Lessard
|-
| style="background:whitesmoke;"|Johnson
|
|Nicole Brouillette 7,157
|
|Claude Boucher 11,331
||
|Éric Charbonneau 11,511
|
|Marcel Pinard 770
|
|Benoit Lapierre 1,188
|
|
||
|Claude Boucher
|-
| style="background:whitesmoke;"|Lévis
|
|Carole Théberge 9,925
|
|Linda Goupil 10,101
||
|Christian Lévesque 17,388
|
|Valérie C.-Guilloteau 866
|
|Jean-Claude Lespérance 1,015
|
|Paul Biron (DCQ) 127Serge Patenaude (M-L) 36
||
|Carole Théberge
|-
| style="background:whitesmoke;"|Lotbinière
|
|Laurent Boissonneault 5,741
|
|Annie Thériault 4,313
||
|Sylvie Roy 15,491
|
|Catherine Drolet 632
|
|
|
|
||
|Sylvie Roy
|-
| style="background:whitesmoke;"|Montmagny-L'Islet
|
|Norbert Morin 8,831
|
|Réjean Boulet 3,512
||
|Claude Roy 10,028
|
|Yvon Léveillée 310
|
|Richard Piper 445
|
|
||
|Norbert Morin
|-
| style="background:whitesmoke;"|Nicolet-Yamaska
|
|Yves Baril 6,770
|
|Donald Martel 7,455
||
|Éric Dorion 10,839
|
|Jean Proulx 1,121
|
|
|
|Simonne Lizotte (Ind) 138
||
|Michel Morin †
|}

Estrie (Eastern Townships)

|-
| style="background:whitesmoke;"|Mégantic-Compton
||
|Johanne Gonthier 8,071
|
|Gloriane Blais 7,094
|
|Jocelyn Brouillette 7,862
|
|Ludovick Nadeau 544
|
|Sébastien Lanctôt 904
|
|
||
|Daniel Bouchard †
|-
| style="background:whitesmoke;"|Orford
||
|Pierre Reid 13,050
|
|Michel Breton 11,153
|
|Steve Bourassa 11,798
|
|Patricia Tremblay 1,404
|
|Louis Hamel 1,798
|
|
||
|Pierre Reid
|-
| style="background:whitesmoke;"|Richmond
||
|Yvon Vallières 11,257
|
|Martyne Prévost 5,485
|
|Pierre Hébert 8,179
|
|Danielle Maire 746
|
|Frédérick Clerson-Guicherd 805
|
|Claude Bergeron (Ind) 129
||
|Yvon Vallières
|-
| style="background:whitesmoke;"|Saint-François
||
|Monique Gagnon-Tremblay 12,523
|
|Mariette Fugère 9,798
|
|François Rioux 7,892
|
|Suzanne Thériault 1,111
|
|Anick Proulx 1,772
|
|
||
|Monique Gagnon-Tremblay
|-
| style="background:whitesmoke;"|Sherbrooke
||
|Jean Charest 13,136
|
|Claude Forgues 11,804
|
|Michel Dumont 6,409
|
|Christian Bibeau 2,263
|
|Steve Dubois 2,203
|
|Hubert Richard (Ind) 115
||
|Jean Charest
|}

Montérégie

Eastern Montérégie

|-
| style="background:whitesmoke;"|Borduas
|
|Jacques Charbonneau 6,978
||
|Pierre Curzi 12,624
|
|Claude Gauthier 10,106
|
|Julie Raby 1,110
|
|Oliver Adam 1,453
|
|Super Cauchon (Ind) 281
||
|Vacant
|-
| style="background:whitesmoke;"|Brome-Missisquoi
||
|Pierre Paradis 13,986
|
|Richard Leclerc 7,114
|
|Jean L'Écuyer 11,029
|
|Lorraine Lasnier 1,058
|
|Vanessa Thibodeau 1,946
|
|
||
|Pierre Paradis
|-
| style="background:whitesmoke;"|Chambly
|
|Marc Tanguay 11,219
|
|Bertrand St-Arnaud 13,469
||
|Richard Merlini 18,145
|
|Alain Dubois 1,517
|
|Marie-Mars Adam 2,266
|
|
||
|Vacant
|-
| style="background:whitesmoke;"|Iberville
|
|Jean Rioux 8,431
|
|Marie Bouillé 9,236
||
|André Riedl 14,395
|
|Danielle Desmarais 777
|
|Alexandre Labbé 1,218
|
|
||
|Jean Rioux
|-
| style="background:whitesmoke;"|Richelieu
|
|Gilles Salvas 7,353
||
|Sylvain Simard 11,461
|
|Philippe Rochat 9,436
|
|Éric Noël 781
|
|François Desmarais 1,024
|
|Normand Philibert (Ind) 146
||
|Sylvain Simard
|-
| style="background:whitesmoke;"|Saint-Hyacinthe
|
|Claude Corbeil 9,563
|
|Léandre Dion 11,879
||
|Claude L'Écuyer 13,216
|
|Richard Gingras 1,029
|
|Catherine Desrochers 1,265
|
|
||
|Léandre Dion
|-
| style="background:whitesmoke;"|Saint-Jean
|
|Jean-Pierre Paquin 10,131
|
|Dave Turcotte 11,916
||
|Lucille Méthé 17,189
|
|Guillaume Tremblay 1,478
|
|
|
|
||
|Jean-Pierre Paquin
|-
| style="background:whitesmoke;"|Shefford
|
|Bernard Brodeur 10,897
|
|Paul Sarrazin 9,280
||
|François Bonnardel 16,648
|
|Ginette Moreau 1,310
|
|Jean-François Arsenault 1,178
|
|Dominic Thibeault (BP) 210
||
|Bernard Brodeur
|-
| style="background:whitesmoke;"|Verchères
|
|Paul Verret 4,783
||
|Stéphane Bergeron 13,811
|
|Luc Robitaille 12,495
|
|Michelle Hudon-David 1,022
|
|Geneviève Ménard 1,405
|
|
||
|Stéphane Bergeron
|}

South Shore

|-
| style="background:whitesmoke;"|Beauharnois
|
|Jean-Guy Hudon 7,679
||
|Serge Deslières 12,967
|
|Michael Betts 9,262
|
|Normand Perry 600
|
|Éric Desormeaux 1,061
|
|
||
|Serge Deslières
|-
| style="background:whitesmoke;"|Châteauguay
||
|Jean-Marc Fournier 15,261
|
|Michel Pinard 11,126
|
|Chantal Marin 12,103
|
|Véronique Pronovost 960
|
|Khalil Saade 1,143
|
|
||
|Jean-Marc Fournier
|-
| style="background:whitesmoke;"|Huntingdon
|
|André Chenail 9,883
|
|Éric Pigeon 7,070
||
|Albert De Martin 13,480
|
|Marc Pronovost 693
|
|
|
|Jean Siouville (Ind) 295
||
|André Chenail
|-
| style="background:whitesmoke;"|La Pinière
||
|Fatima Houda-Pepin 17,786
|
|Saloua Hassoun 6,281
|
|Marc-André Beauchemin 8,654
|
|Jean-Claude Bernheim 860
|
|Claude Breton 1,684
|
|
||
|Fatima Houda-Pepin
|-
| style="background:whitesmoke;"|Laporte
||
|Nicole Ménard 13,219
|
|Robert Pellan 8,137
|
|Michel Beaudoin 7,689
|
|Michèle St-Denis 1,318
|
|Richard Morisset 1,998
|
|
||
|Michel Audet †
|-
| style="background:whitesmoke;"|La Prairie
|
|Jean Dubuc 12,253
|
|François Rebello 13,113
||
|Monique Roy Verville 14,458
|
|Antoine Pich 818
|
|Louis Corbeil 1,605
|
|Normand Chouinard (M-L) 60 Guy Latour (BP) 238 Martin McNeil (Ind) 179
||
|Jean Dubuc
|-
| style="background:whitesmoke;"|Marguerite-D'Youville
|
|Pierre Moreau 11,390
|
|Sébastien Gagnon 13,017
||
|Simon-Pierre Diamond 15,572
|
|Daniel Michelin 2,014
|
|
|
|
||
|Pierre Moreau
|-
| style="background:whitesmoke;"|Marie-Victorin
|
|Nic Leblanc 5,974
||
|Bernard Drainville 11,055
|
|Roger Dagenais 7,928
|
|François Cyr 1,420
|
|Réal Langelier 1,327
|
|Richard Lemagnifique (BP) 211
||
|Cécile Vermette †
|-
| style="background:whitesmoke;"|Soulanges
||
|Lucie Charlebois 10,689
|
|Marc Laviolette 7,821
|
|Sylvain Brazeau 9,212
|
|Marielle Rodrigue 442
|
|Alain Brazeau 1,389
|
|Gilles Paquette (Ind) 113
||
|Lucie Charlebois
|-
| style="background:whitesmoke;"|Taillon
|
|Anne Pâquet 9,092
||
|Marie Malavoy 13,991
|
|Karine Simard 12,588
|
|Manon Blanchard 1,878
|
|Jonathan Mortreux 1,971
|
|
||
|Marie Malavoy
|-
| style="background:whitesmoke;"|Vachon
|
|Brigitte Mercier 8,184
||
|Camil Bouchard 11,560
|
|Maro Akoury 11,333
|
|Richard St-Onge 755
|
|Denis Durand 1,309
|
|
||
|Camil Bouchard
|-
| style="background:whitesmoke;"|Vaudreuil
||
|Yvon Marcoux 15,465
|
|Louisanne Chevrier 8,198
|
|Jean-Claude Lévesque 8,787
|
|Micheline Déry 686
|
|Jean-Yves Massenet 1940
|
|
||
|Yvon Marcoux
|}

Montreal

East

|-
| style="background:whitesmoke;"|Anjou
||
|Lise Thériault 13,280
|
|Sébastien Richard 8,795
|
|Lorraine Laperrière 7,379
|
|Francine Gagné 1,151
|
|Alain Bissonnette 1,366
|
|Hélène Héroux (M-L) 107
||
|Lise Thériault
|-
| style="background:whitesmoke;"|Bourassa-Sauvé
||
|Line Beauchamp 15,730
|
|Roland Carrier 7,140
|
|Guy Mailloux 6,430
|
|Marie-Noëlle Doucet-Paquin 1,083
|
|Marie-Ange Germain 895
|
|Charles-Antoine Gabriel (Ind) 161
||
|Line Beauchamp
|-
| style="background:whitesmoke;"|Bourget
|
|Pierre Carrier 7,566
||
|Diane Lemieux 13,359
|
|Clairmont De La Croizetière 7,467
|
|Lynda Gadoury 1,363
|
|Scott McKay 2,680
|
|Claudette Deschamps (DCQ) 227
||
|Diane Lemieux
|-
| style="background:whitesmoke;"|Crémazie
|
|Michèle Lamquin-Éthier 11,919
||
|Lisette Lapointe 12,282
|
|Geneviève Tousignant 5,475
|
|André Frappier 2,184
|
|Nathalie Gingras 1,941
|
|Marsha Fine (M-L) 109
||
|Michèle Lamquin-Éthier
|-
| style="background:whitesmoke;"|Gouin
|
|Nathalie Rivard 5,612
||
|Nicolas Girard 11,318
|
|Jean-Philip Ruel 3,540
|
|Françoise David 7,913
|
|Yohan Tremblay 1,744
|
|Hugô St-Onge (BP) 157 Jocelyne Leduc (Ind) 109
||
|Nicolas Girard
|-
| style="background:whitesmoke;"|Hochelaga-Maisonneuve
|
|Vahid Vidah-Fortin 3,378
||
|Louise Harel 13,043
|
|Marie-Chantal Pelletier 3,837
|
|Gabriel Chevrefils 2,384
|
|Geneviève Guérin 1,756
|
|Christine Dandenault (M-L) 64Daniel Laforest (Ind) 96 Starbuck Leroidurock (BP) 195
||
|Louise Harel
|-
| style="background:whitesmoke;"|Jeanne-Mance–Viger
||
|Michel Bissonnet 20,715
|
|Kamal El Batal 3,648
|
|Carole Giroux 4,571
|
|Ramon Villaruel 635
|
|Hamadou Abdel Kader Nikiema 790
|
|Stéphane Chénier (M-L) 101
||
|Michel Bissonnet
|-
| style="background:whitesmoke;"|LaFontaine
||
|Tony Tomassi 16,281
|
|Guido Renzi 3,715
|
|Marie-Êve Campéano 4,752
|
|Victorien Pilote 552
|
|Jean-Christophe Mortreux 765
|
|
||
|Tony Tomassi
|-
| style="background:whitesmoke;"|Laurier-Dorion
||
|Gerry Sklavounos 12,054
|
|Elsie Lefebvre 10,968
|
|Louise Levesque 2,874
|
|Ruba Ghazal 2,421
|
|Sébastien Chagnon-Jean 1,639
|
|Mostafa Ben Kirane (No designation) 115 Peter Macrisopoulos (M-L) 166 Gerakis Vassilios (Ind) 170
||
|Elsie Lefebvre
|-
| style="background:whitesmoke;"|Mercier
|
|Nathalie Rochefort 5,601
||
|Daniel Turp 9,426
|
|Gabriel Tupula Yamba 2,381
|
|Amir Khadir 8,303
|
|Sylvain Valiquette 2,398
|
|Nicky Tanguay (BP) 156
||
|Daniel Turp
|-
| style="background:whitesmoke;"|Pointe-aux-Trembles
|
|Daniel Fournier 5,299
||
|André Boisclair 13,792
|
|Martin-Karl Bourbonnais 7,691
|
|Dominique Ritchot 763
|
|Xavier Daxhelet 1,249
|
|Julien Ferron (DCQ) 123 Geneviève Royer (M-L) 40 Etienne Mallette (BP) 153
||
|André Boisclair
|-
| style="background:whitesmoke;"|Rosemont
|
|Yasmine Alloul 9,963
||
|Rita Dionne-Marsolais 14,110
|
|L. Thierry Bernard 6,933
|
|François Saillant 3,420
|
|Marc-André Gadoury 1,938
|
|Garnet Colly (M-L) 82Raphaël Turbide (BP) 330
||
|Rita Dionne-Marsolais
|-
| style="background:whitesmoke;"|Sainte-Marie–Saint-Jacques
|
|Denise Dussault 6,021
||
|Martin Lemay 10,501
|
|Jean-Stéphane Dupervil 2,733
|
|Manon Massé 3,596
|
|Corinne Ardon 2,460
|
|Serge Lachapelle (M-L) 92
||
|Martin Lemay
|-
| style="background:whitesmoke;"|Viau
||
|Emmanuel Dubourg 12,917
|
|Naïma Mimoune 5,406
|
|Sylvie Fontaine 4,157
|
|Valérie Lavoie 1,231
|
|Simon Bernier 1,169
|
|
||
|William Cusano †
|}

West

|-
| style="background:whitesmoke;"|Acadie
||
|Christine St-Pierre 18,090
|
|Frédéric Lapointe 4,994
|
|Charles Ghorayeb 4,352
|
|André Parizeau 1,137
|
|Nicolas Rémillard-Tessier 1,511
|
|
||
|Yvan Bordeleau †
|-
| style="background:whitesmoke;"|D'Arcy-McGee
||
|Lawrence Bergman 18,411
|
|Pierre-Philippe Emond 710
|
|Marcelle Guay 934
|
|Abraham Weizfeld 338
|
|Robert Leibner 1,470
|
|
||
|Lawrence Bergman
|-
| style="background:whitesmoke;"|Jacques-Cartier
||
|Geoffrey Kelley 22,381
|
|Sophia Caporicci 1,352
|
|Walter Rulli 3,973
|
|Jill Hanley 501
|
|Ryan Young 3,545
|
|Andy Srougi (Ind) 166
||
|Geoffrey Kelley
|-
| style="background:whitesmoke;"|Marguerite-Bourgeoys
||
|Monique Jérôme-Forget 16,752
|
|Siou Fan Houang 4,687
|
|Martin Marquis 5,518
|
|Jocelyne Desautels 717
|
|Serge Bellemare 1,454
|
|Yves Le Seigle (M-L) 56 Marc Veilleux (DCQ) 122
||
|Monique Jérôme-Forget
|-
| style="background:whitesmoke;"|Marquette
||
|François Ouimet 14,985
|
|Daniel Hurteau 6,448
|
|Mark Yerbury 6,464
|
|Johanne Létourneau 944
|
|Réjean Malette 2,313
|
|Russell Wood (Ind) 220
||
|François Ouimet
|-
| style="background:whitesmoke;"|Mont-Royal
||
|Pierre Arcand 16,066
|
|Zhao Xin Wu 2,197
|
|Alexandre Tremblay-Michaud 1,893
|
|Antonio Artuso 801
|
|Boris-Antoine Legault 1,710
|
|Diane Johnston (M-L) 108
||
|Philippe Couillard
|-
| style="background:whitesmoke;"|Nelligan
||
|Yolande James 21,458
|
|Dorothée Morin 2,977
|
|Jean Lecavalier 6,096
|
|Elahé Machouf 532
|
|Jonathan Théorêt 2,560
|
|
||
|Yolande James
|-
| style="background:whitesmoke;"|Notre-Dame-de-Grâce
||
|Russell Copeman 14,825
|
|Sophie Fréchette 2,460
|
|Julie Clouatre 1,745
|
|David Mandel 1,105
|
|Peter McQueen 3,839
|
|Linda Sullivan (M-L) 70
||
|Russell Copeman
|-
| style="background:whitesmoke;"|Outremont
||
|Raymond Bachand 11,861
|
|Salim Laaroussi 5,928
|
|Pierre Harvey 2,236
|
|Sujata Dey 2,303
|
|Luc Côté 2,723
|
|Romain Angeles (Ind) 101Yvon Breton (M-L) 68
||
|Raymond Bachand
|-
| style="background:whitesmoke;"|Saint-Henri–Sainte-Anne
||
|Marguerite Blais 11,915
|
|Robin Philpot 9,162
|
|Chantal Beauregard 5,422
|
|Arthur Sandborn 2,037
|
|Shawna O'Flaherty 2,179
|
|Andrzej Jastrzebski (DCQ) 141Rachel Hoffman (M-L) 103
||
|Nicole Loiselle †
|-
| style="background:whitesmoke;"|Robert-Baldwin
||
|Pierre Marsan 22,131
|
|Alexandre Pagé-Chassé 1,578
|
|Ginette Lemire 3,243
|
|Jocelyne Mesish 517
|
|Shawn Katz 2,136
|
|
||
|Pierre Marsan
|-
| style="background:whitesmoke;"|Saint-Laurent
||
|Jacques Dupuis 19,970
|
|William Fayad 3,447
|
|Jose Fiorilo 3,373
|
|Wissam Saliba 856
|
|Stephen Marchant 1,718
|
|Fernand Deschamps (M-L) 141
||
|Jacques Dupuis
|-
| style="background:whitesmoke;"|Verdun
||
|Henri-François Gautrin 12,204
|
|Richard Langlais 8,688
|
|Sylvie Tremblay 5,239
|
|David Fennario 1,430
|
|Pierre-Yves McSween 1,868
|
|Normand Fournier (M-L) 74Robert Lindblad (Ind) 80Gilles Noël (DCQ) 118 Sala Samghour (BP) 106
||
|Henri-François Gautrin
|-
| style="background:whitesmoke;"|Westmount–Saint-Louis
||
|Jacques Chagnon 13,311
|
|Denise Laroche 1,679
|
|Caroline Morgan 1,538
|
|Nadia Alexan 800
|
|Patrick Daoust 2,517
|
|Nicholas Lin (M-L) 72
||
|Jacques Chagnon
|}

Laval

|-
| style="background:whitesmoke;"|Chomedey
||
|Guy Ouellette 18,625
|
|Joëlle Quérin 5,186
|
|Phani Papachristou 7,915
|
|Francine Bellerose 691
|
|Jean Martin 1,241
|
|Noemia Onofre de Lima (No designation) 307Polyvios Tsakanikas (M-L) 102
||
|Thomas J. Mulcair †
|-
| style="background:whitesmoke;"|Fabre
||
|Michelle Courchesne 14,410
|
|Guy Lachapelle 11,074
|
|Patrick Pilotte 13,176
|
|Marie-France Phisel 881
|
|Julien Boisseau 1846
|
|
||
|Michelle Courchesne
|-
| style="background:whitesmoke;"|Laval-des-Rapides
||
|Alain Paquet 11,532
|
|Marc Demers 10,048
|
|Robert Goulet 9,344
|
|Nicole Caron 1,145
|
|Michel Lefebvre 1,460
|
|
||
|Alain Paquet
|-
| style="background:whitesmoke;"|Mille-Îles
||
|Maurice Clermont 15,978
|
|Maude Delangis 11,158
|
|Pierre Tremblay 11,330
|
|Nicole Bellerose 1,218
|
|Christian Lajoie 1,507
|
|Régent Millette (Ind) 96
||
|Maurice Clermont
|-
| style="background:whitesmoke;"|Vimont
||
|Vincent Auclair 14,942
|
|Marie-France Charbonneau 11,255
|
|François Gaudreau 12,897
|
|Mickael Labrie 879
|
|Catherine Ouellet-Cummings 1,606
|
|
||
|Vincent Auclair
|}

Lanaudière

|-
| style="background:whitesmoke;"|Berthier
|
|Carole Majeau 6,699
|
|Alexandre Bourdeau 13,382
||
|François Benjamin 16,219
|
|Jocelyne Dupuis 1,089
|
|André Chauvette 1,092
|
|
||
|Alexandre Bourdeau
|-
| style="background:whitesmoke;"|Joliette
|
|Céline Beaulieu 7,555
|
|Claude Duceppe 13,056
||
|Pascal Beaupré 13,803
|
|Flavie Trudel 1,703
|
|Johanne Edsell 1,169
|
|
||
|Jonathan Valois †
|-
| style="background:whitesmoke;"|L'Assomption
|
|Benoit Verstraete 8,235
|
|Jean-Claude St-André 14,287
||
|Éric Laporte 16,510
|
|Olivier Huard 1,303
|
|Michel Ménard 1,777
|
|
||
|Jean-Claude St-André
|-
| style="background:whitesmoke;"|Masson
|
|Denise Cloutier 6,064
|
|Luc Thériault 15,318
||
|Ginette Grandmont 18,772
|
|Marco Legrand 1,062
|
|Jean Bonneau 1,567
|
|
||
|Luc Thériault
|-
| style="background:whitesmoke;"|Rousseau
|
|Yves Prud'Homme 5,405
||
|François Legault 14,670
|
|Jean-Pierre Parrot 13,264
|
|Alex Boisdequin-Lefort 789
|
|Richard Chatagneau 992
|
|
||
|François Legault
|-
| style="background:whitesmoke;"|Terrebonne
|
|Chantal Leblanc 6,720
|
|Jocelyne Caron 15,160
||
|Jean-François Therrien 17,223
|
|Jean Baril 1,136
|
|Pierre-Charles De Guise 1,508
|
|
||
|Jocelyne Caron
|}

Laurentides

|-
| style="background:whitesmoke;"|Argenteuil
||
|David Whissell 9,919
|
|John Saywell 6,796
|
|Georges Lapointe 7,794
|
|Guy Dufresne 582
|
|Claude Sabourin 1,233
|
|
||
|David Whissell
|-
| style="background:whitesmoke;"|Bertrand
|
|Daniel Desjardins 9,092
||
|Claude Cousineau 13,672
|
|Sylvain Charron 11,188
|
|Jocelyne Lavoie 1,226
|
|Richard Savignac 1,762
|
|
||
|Claude Cousineau
|-
| style="background:whitesmoke;"|Blainville
|
|Roberto Rego 8,081
|
|Richard Legendre 13,974
||
|Pierre Gingras 17,609
|
|Francis Gagnon-Bergmann 797
|
|Geoffroy Chartrand 1,561
|
|
||
|Richard Legendre
|-
| style="background:whitesmoke;"|Deux-Montagnes
|
|Paule Fortier 8,182
|
|Daniel Goyer 11,283
||
|Lucie Leblanc 12,415
|
|Julien Demers 737
|
|Guy Rainville 1,506
|
|Manon Bissonnette (Ind) 114
||
|Hélène Robert †
|-
| style="background:whitesmoke;"|Groulx
|
|Pierre Descoteaux 9,853
|
|Rachel Gagnon 10,486
||
|Linda Lapointe 13,605
|
|Adam Veilleux 849
|
|Robert Harenclak 1,504
|
|
||
|Pierre Descoteaux
|-
| style="background:whitesmoke;"|Labelle
|
|Déborah Bélanger 6,958
||
|Sylvain Pagé 13,926
|
|Claude Ouellette 7,689
|
|Luc Boisjoli 893
|
|François Beauchamp 1,188
|
|
||
|Sylvain Pagé
|-
| style="background:whitesmoke;"|Mirabel
|
|Ritha Cossette 5,520
|
|Denise Beaudoin 11,691
||
|François Desrochers 15,243
|
|Jocelyn Parent 630
|
|Sylvain Castonguay 1,233
|
|
||
|Denise Beaudoin
|-
| style="background:whitesmoke;"|Prévost
|
|Richard Bélisle 7,929
|
|Lucie Papineau 15,189
||
|Martin Camirand 15,996
|
|Mylène Jaccoud 1,588
|
|
|
|
||
|Lucie Papineau
|}

Outaouais

|-
| style="background:whitesmoke;"|Chapleau
||
|Benoît Pelletier 14,581
|
|Edith Gendron 7,137
|
|Jocelyn Dumais 8,071
|
|Jennifer Jean-Brice Vales 774
|
|Roger Fleury 1,755
|
|Pierre Soublière (M-L) 65
||
|Benoît Pelletier
|-
| style="background:whitesmoke;"|Gatineau
||
|Stéphanie Vallée 13,575
|
|Thérèse Viel-Déry 7,204
|
|Martin Otis 6,440
|
|Carmen Boucher 892
|
|Gail Lemmon Walker 1,949
|
|Lisa Leblanc (M-L) 145
||
|Réjean Lafrenière †
|-
| style="background:whitesmoke;"|Hull
||
|Roch Cholette 12,661
|
|Marcel Painchaud 7,130
|
|François Lizotte 5,067
|
|Bill Clennett 2,370
|
|Mélanie Perreault 2,485
|
|Gabriel-Girard Bernier (M-L) 68
||
|Roch Cholette
|-
| style="background:whitesmoke;"|Papineau
||
|Norman MacMillan 13,530
|
|Gilles Hébert 9,317
|
|Serge Charette 9,087
|
|Marie-Élaine Rouleau 1,033
|
|Patrick Mailloux 1,643
|
|
||
|Norman MacMillan
|-
| style="background:whitesmoke;"|Pontiac
||
|Charlotte L'Écuyer 14,817
|
|Patrick Robert-Meunier 3,257
|
|Victor Bilodeau 3,943
|
|Jessica Squires 739
|
|Brian Gibb 2,498
|
|David Ethier-April (M-L) 66
||
|Charlotte L'Écuyer
|-
|}

Abitibi-Témiscamingue and Nord-du-Québec

|-
| style="background:whitesmoke;"|Abitibi-Est
|
|Pierre Corbeil 7,545
||
|Alexis Wawanoloath 8,262
|
|Gilles Gagnon 5,060
|
|France-Claude Goyette 1,042
|
|
|
|
||
|Pierre Corbeil
|-
| style="background:whitesmoke;"|Abitibi-Ouest
|
|Jean-Louis Carignan 5,376
||
|François Gendron 10,983
|
|Éric Mathieu 5,529
|
|Caroline Sigouin 814
|
|
|
|
||
|François Gendron
|-
| style="background:whitesmoke;"|Rouyn-Noranda–Témiscamingue
|
|Daniel Bernard 9,352
||
|Johanne Morasse 9,481
|
|Mario Provencher 7,687
|
|France Caouette 2,117
|
|
|
|
||
|Daniel Bernard
|-
| style="background:whitesmoke;"|Ungava
|
|Aline Sauvageau 3,577
||
|Luc Ferland 4,555
|
|Jacques L. Cadieux 2,363
|
|Gilbert Hamel 506
|
|
|
|
||
|Michel Létourneau †
|}

See also
 38th National Assembly of Quebec
 Politics of Quebec
 List of premiers of Quebec
 List of leaders of the Official Opposition (Quebec)
 National Assembly of Quebec
 Timeline of Quebec history
 Political parties in Quebec

References

Further reading

External links
 Results by party (total votes and seats won)
 Results for all ridings
Official election site by Chief Electoral Officer of Quebec
TrendLines Research Chart Tracking of 2008 Quebec & Federal Riding Projection models
Quebec Votes 2007 from the CBC
Quebec Votes from the Montreal Gazette
Election Almanac - Quebec Provincial Election
DemocraticSPACE Quebec 2007 Coverage
Predictions HKDP - Electoral Scenario Creator 
Quebec Politique.com

Quebec general election
Elections in Quebec
General election
Quebec general election